Donald Spore Johnson (December 7, 1911 – April 6, 2000), nicknamed "Pep", was a Major League Baseball second baseman for the Chicago Cubs from 1943 to 1948.  A native of Chicago, he attended Oregon State University before beginning his professional baseball career.

Johnson's best seasons were during World War II. In 1944, a season in which he had a career-high 71 runs batted in, he was selected for the All-Star Game.  In 1945, he was an important part of the last Cubs team until 2016 to win a pennant, hitting a career-high .302 and scoring 94 runs, tenth in the league.  He was also selected for the unofficial "All-Star Game" that was organized by the Associated Press after the official game was canceled.

Until Dexter Fowler led off in the 2016 World Series, Johnson was the last Cub to come to bat in a World Series game. He grounded into a force out to end the 1945 World Series defeat to the Detroit Tigers.

Career totals for 511 games include 528 hits, 8 home runs, 175 runs batted in, 219 runs scored, a .273 batting average, and an on-base percentage of .315.

His father was former major league shortstop Ernie Johnson.

See also
 List of second-generation Major League Baseball players

References
 

Retrosheet

1911 births
2000 deaths
Baseball players from Chicago
Chicago Cubs players
Des Moines Bruins players
Hollywood Stars players
Los Angeles Angels (minor league) players
Major League Baseball second basemen
Milwaukee Brewers (minor league) players
Mission Reds players
National League All-Stars
Oregon State Beavers baseball players
Reading Red Sox players
Sacramento Senators players
Sacramento Solons players
Seattle Indians players
Tulsa Oilers (baseball) players